Add MS 14470 is a Bohairic, uncial manuscript of the New Testament, with a few Armenian fragments. The manuscript is written on vellum and paper. Palaeographically it has been assigned to the 5th or 6th century. The manuscript has survived in a fragmentary condition. It is now in the British Library as Add MS 14470, under the title "PART Of the Gospel of St. John, the Epistles of St. Paul, and the Acts of the Apostles, Peshito version; imperfect". It forms part of the series Add MSS 14425-14741, described in the British Library catalogue as "Manuscripts obtained from the Syrian Monastery of St. Mary Deipara, in the Desert of Nitria, or Scete".

Description 

The following fragments of the Bohairic New Testament on vellum are important on account of their antiquity:
 Luke 8:2-7.8-10.13-18
 2 Corinthians 4:2-5:4
 Ephesians 2:10-19; 2:21-3:11
 1 Thessalonians 3:3-6; 3:11-4:1
The fragment from the Ephesians is the most ancient from them. The manuscript contains also several paper fragments of the Bohairic New Testament, belonged chiefly to lectionaries.

History 

Lightfoot examined the manuscript.

See also 

 List of the Coptic New Testament manuscripts
 Coptic versions of the Bible
 Biblical manuscript
 Oriental MS 1316

References 

Coptic New Testament manuscripts
13th-century biblical manuscripts
British Library additional manuscripts